Of Sound Mind is the second album by Los Angeles-based psychedelic rock band Ancestors, released on October 6, 2009 by Tee Pee Records. The album's artwork was created by Derek Albeck.

Track listing

References

External links
Of Sound Mind preview at Stereogum
Of Sound Mind preview at Brooklyn Vegan
Of Sound Mind review at PopDose

2009 albums
Ancestors (band) albums
Tee Pee Records albums